Captain Victory is a comic book originally created, written and drawn by Jack Kirby. It was first published by American comic book publisher Pacific Comics in 1981. Kirby agreed to create a comic for the fledgling publisher because Pacific promised him full creative control, and ownership of the characters.

Publication history
One of Pacific Comics first titles, the original run of Captain Victory and the Galactic Rangers lasted thirteen issues, plus a special, through January, 1984.  All were written, illustrated, and edited by Jack Kirby.

In the last issues of the Pacific series, Kirby crafted an origin story for Captain Victory which he tied into the New Gods comic book that he had written and drawn for DC Comics in the 1970s. It was suggested that Captain Victory was the son of Orion, of the New Gods. Orion was not specifically named, but a number of clues were planted, including equipment said to belong to Captain Victory's father that was identical to the astro-harness ridden by Orion in the earlier series. Additionally, Captain Victory's grandfather, Blackmaas, was illustrated only as a cast shadow, but a shadow that to many readers bore a resemblance to Orion's father, Darkseid.

After the end of Pacific, no more was seen of Captain Victory until Topps Comics attempted to revive the character as part of a planned 5-issue mini-series. It only lasted one issue (Victory #1, June 1994) before Topps cancelled all of the 'Kirbyverse' books in 1994. This issue was a part of a more complex project named Secret City Saga.

TwoMorrows Publishing created a 'graphite edition' reprint of the first Captain Victory issue. The edition, in TwoMorrow's words, "presented [Captain Victory #1] as it was created (before it was broken up for the later Pacific Comics series), reproduced from copies of Jack's uninked pencils!"

In 2000, Jack Kirby's grandson Jeremy Kirby launched Jack Kirby Comics, the fledgling company's only offering being a three-issue retelling of Captain Victory, reordered and rescripted by Jeremy. The quality of issues, anyway, is judged fairly inferior to the originals, despite the interesting cover art. The title of the comic book is the same as the original from 1981. The 3rd issue was published exclusively on the web.

In 2006, a new series was published, based on recently discovered initial, and rejected, character sketches for the Wonder Warriors. Jack Kirby's Galactic Bounty Hunters was co-written by Jack's daughter, Lisa, and is creator-owned by her under Marvel's Icon imprint. Captain Victory and the Galactic Rangers guest-starred in issue #3 of the six-issue limited series.

In late 2011, Dynamite Entertainment started a new series under the Kirby: Genesis title, which used many of Kirby's created and owned characters (many unpublished), including Captain Victory. This led, in November 2011, to a new Captain Victory title which lasted six issues. It was later collected into a trade paperback.

A new continuing series, Captain Victory and the Galactic Rangers, written by Joe Casey and published by Dynamite Entertainment, began in August 2014. It ran for 6 issues and was collected into a trade paperback in 2016.

Collected editions
In February 2007, Erik Larsen reported that Image Comics planned to publish a completely recolored one volume collection of Jack Kirby's 14 issues of Captain Victory. In July of the same year, he announced that Image Comics would be publishing an all-new Captain Victory comic book featuring many of Jack Kirby's never-before-seen creations. The hardcover collection was scheduled to be released in November 2007, but production issues delayed the hardcover, so that better source material could be located.

References

External links

Captain Victory and the Galactic Rangers at Don Markstein's Toonopedia. Archived from the original on April 13, 2012.

1981 comics debuts
1984 comics endings
Comics by Jack Kirby
Comics set on fictional planets
Dynamite Entertainment titles
Topps Comics titles
Image Comics titles
Science fiction comics
Dynamite Entertainment characters